Marcin Wika (born 9 November 1983) is a Polish volleyball player, a member of Poland men's national volleyball team in 2008-2009 and Polish club Espadon Szczecin, a participant of the Olympic Games Beijing 2008,

Personal life
Wika was born in Puck, Poland. He is married to Anna (née Białobrzeska), who is also a volleyball player. They have two children - daughter Aleksandra and son Oskar (born 2012).

Career

Clubs
He is Polish Champion in season 2003/2004, silver medalist of Polish Championship 2005/2006 with Jastrzębski Węgiel. In 2006 moved to Wkręt-met Domex AZS Częstochowa. He won with club from Częstochowa Polish Cup and silver medal of Polish Championship 2007/2008. Next 2 seasons spent in Asseco Resovia Rzeszów. He won silver (2008/2009) and bronze medal (2009/2010) of Polish Championship. In 2010/2011 spent in Jastrzębski Węgiel. In 2011-2014 was a player of Transfer Bydgoszcz.

Sporting achievements

Clubs

National championship
 2003/2004  Polish Championship, with Jastrzębski Węgiel
 2005/2006  Polish Championship, with Jastrzębski Węgiel
 2007/2008  Polish Cup, with Wkręt-met Domex AZS Częstochowa
 2007/2008  Polish Championship, with Wkręt-met Domex AZS Częstochowa
 2008/2009  Polish Championship, with Asseco Resovia Rzeszów
 2009/2010  Polish Championship, with Asseco Resovia Rzeszów
 2014/2015  Swiss Championship, with PV Lugano

Individually
 2008 Memorial of Zdzisław Ambroziak - Best Server
 2008 Polish Cup - Best Server
 2008 Polish Cup - Most Valuable Player
 2008 Memorial of Hubert Jerzy Wagner - Best Receiver

References

External links
 PlusLiga player profile

1983 births
Living people
People from Puck, Poland
Sportspeople from Pomeranian Voivodeship
Polish men's volleyball players
Olympic volleyball players of Poland
Volleyball players at the 2008 Summer Olympics
Polish Champions of men's volleyball
Jastrzębski Węgiel players
AZS Częstochowa players
Resovia (volleyball) players
BKS Visła Bydgoszcz players
BBTS Bielsko-Biała players
Outside hitters